Strzygi may refer to:

Strzygi, Brodnica County, Poland
Strzygi, Włocławek County, Poland